The Sumatran woodpecker (Picus dedemi) is a species of bird in the family Picidae. It was formerly considered a subspecies of the grey-headed woodpecker (Picus canus), but was split as a distinct species by the IOC in 2021. 

It is found in Sumatra. Its natural habitats are subtropical or tropical moist lowland forest and subtropical or tropical mangrove forest.

References

Sumatran woodpecker
Sumatran woodpecker
Sumatran woodpecker